The 1975 Milwaukee Brewers season involved the Brewers' finishing fifth in the American League East with a record of 68 wins and 94 losses.

Offseason 
 November 2, 1974: Dave May and a player to be named later were traded by the Brewers to the Atlanta Braves for Hank Aaron. The Milwaukee Brewers completed the trade by sending Roger Alexander (minors) to the Braves on December 2.
January 9, 1975: Lenn Sakata was drafted by the Milwaukee Brewers in the 1st round (10th pick) of the 1975 amateur draft (January Secondary).

Regular season

Season standings

Record vs. opponents

Notable transactions 
 April 3, 1975: Jesús Vega was signed as an amateur free agent by the Brewers.
 May 8, 1975: Bob Coluccio was traded by the Brewers to the Chicago White Sox for Bill Sharp.
 June 14, 1975: Johnny Briggs was traded by the Brewers to the Minnesota Twins for Bobby Darwin.

Roster

Player stats

Batting

Starters by position 
Note: Pos = Position; G = Games played; AB = At bats; H = Hits; Avg. = Batting average; HR = Home runs; RBI = Runs batted in

Other batters 
Note: G = Games played; AB = At bats; H = Hits; Avg. = Batting average; HR = Home runs; RBI = Runs batted in

Pitching

Starting pitchers 
Note: G = Games pitched; IP = Innings pitched; W = Wins; L = Losses; ERA = Earned run average; SO = Strikeouts

Other pitchers 
Note: G = Games pitched; IP = Innings pitched; W = Wins; L = Losses; ERA = Earned run average; SO = Strikeouts

Relief pitchers 
Note: G = Games pitched; W = Wins; L = Losses; SV = Saves; ERA = Earned run average; SO = Strikeouts

Farm system

The Brewers' farm system consisted of four minor league affiliates in 1975. The Newark Co-Pilots won the New York–Penn League championship.

Notes

References 
1975 Milwaukee Brewers at Baseball Reference
1975 Milwaukee Brewers at Baseball Almanac

Milwaukee Brewers seasons
Milwaukee Brewers season
Mil